On October 3, 2022, Percy Lapid, a radio journalist and radio broadcaster, was shot dead while on his way home in Las Piñas, Metro Manila, Philippines.

Percy Lapid

Percival Carag Mabasa (March 14, 1959 – October 3, 2022), known professionally as Percy Lapid, was a Filipino journalist and radio broadcaster. He was a critic of President Bongbong Marcos and his predecessor, Rodrigo Duterte. He hosted the radio program Lapid Fire on DWBL, where he tackled cases of corruption. He disclosed irregularities regarding the Sugar Regulatory Administration's aborted Sugar Order No. 4 amidst a sugar crisis. The scandal faced by the Marcos administration led to the resignation of the executive secretary Vic Rodriguez in September 2022.

Lapid was vocal against the dangers of red-tagging, a practice where the government attempts to silence journalists and other dissenters by accusing them of being communists. He was also outspoken against disinformation and the government's war on drugs.

Aside from being a DWBL host, Lapid has also been a radio reporter and commentator since 1985 for DWXI, DZME, DWBC, DZRM, DWIZ, and DZRJ and a columnist for the tabloid Hataw.

Killing

Percy Lapid was killed on October 3, 2022, at around 8:30 pm (UTC+8) while he was driving on his way home to BF Resort Village, a gated community in Las Piñas. There was a traffic buildup at the subdivision's gate near Aria Street in Barangay Talon 2 due to the routine inspection of all vehicles for a sticker required for entry into the subdivision. A motorcycle with two people on board approached Lapid's vehicle in the queue, and the gunman from this motorcycle fired two shots at Lapid, killing Lapid instantly.

Lapid was the third journalist in the Philippines to be killed in 2022, according to data from UNESCO, and the second during the presidency of Bongbong Marcos, according to the National Union of Journalists of the Philippines.

Perpetrators
Two motorcycle-riding men were seen being involved in Lapid's killing. The police identified one "person-of-interest", a man wearing a pink jacket who was walking near the Las Piñas City Hall, about five minutes away from Lapid's home. Department of the Interior and Local Government Secretary Benhur Abalos believed the killer to be a professional gunman.

Joel Escorial surrendered to the authorities on October 17, 2022, and confessed to being the gunman in Lapid's killing. He implicated brothers Edmon and Israel Dimaculangan as his partners in crime, and stated that they received orders from an individual named "Orlando" or "Orly", who in turn answered to another person detained inside the New Bilibid Prison, later identified as Jun Villamor. Christopher Bacoto, also known as Jerry Sandoval, has been alleged as another middleman who tasked Escorial, the Dimaculangan brothers, and "Orly", with the killing of Lapid.

The National Bureau of Investigation (NBI) and the Philippine National Police (PNP) would file charges against several people in connection with Lapid's death, including Bureau of Corrections Director General Gerald Bantag who was formally charged with murder.

Bantag maintained innocence and alleges that drug lord German Agojo was responsible for the killing.

In March 2023, the Department of Justice indicted a total of seventeen individuals over the killings of Lapid and Villamor. Double murder charges were separately filed before the Regional Trial Courts of Muntinlupa (on the case of Villamor) on March 13, and of Las Piñas (that of Lapid) on March 14. The panel of prosecutors said it found probable cause to charge Bantag and Zulueta as "principal by inducement." Also indicted as principals are:
 Two "persons deprived of liberty" (PDLs) involved in both cases (by indispensable cooperation in Lapid case; by inducement in Villamor case).
 In Lapid case: Four by direct participation, including Escorial; three more PDLs by indispensable cooperation.
 In Villamor case: Six PDLs by direct participation.

Investigation
The Philippine National Police (PNP) and the Commission on Human Rights opened investigations into the killing. The PNP reviewed CCTV cameras along the known route taken by Lapid, the dashcam on the victim's vehicle, and Lapid's cellphone, and interviewed the victim's family. The PNP's National Capital Region Police Office stated that they did not find any evidence on Lapid's cellphone and that Lapid's family was not aware of any threats to the journalist's life. The police did not determine a motive for the killing.

Joel Escorial surrendered to authorities on October 17, 2022, and confessed to being the gunman in Percy Lapid's killing. He named Jun Villamor as his contact inside the New Bilibid Prison. Villamor would die on October 18. The Bureau of Corrections' initial investigation concluded that Villamor died of natural causes and not as a result of foul play. The National Bureau of Investigation (NBI) also conducted an autopsy and found no signs of external injury on Villamor's body. This was, however, contradicted by the findings of a second autopsy conducted by a forensic pathologist Raquel Fortun, who concluded that Villamor died of suffocation from a plastic bag.

President Marcos ordered Justice secretary Jesus Crispin Remulla to place Bureau of Corrections Director General Gerald Bantag under preventive suspension for 90 days pending investigation on his role in the killing. The NBI established from sworn statements from certain "persons deprived of liberty" (PDLs) that there was a clear direct line of communication between Bantag and deputy security officer Ricardo Zulueta and Escorial through middlemen which included Alvin Labra and gang leader Aldrin Galicia. Bantag's being the subject of criticisms by Lapid on his radio program Lapid Fire was cited as a possible motivation for the killing.

Reactions

Initial reaction
Lapid's killing received condemnation both domestically and internationally and from foreign governments and media organizations. Media watchdogs and human rights organizations noted how the Philippines is one of the most dangerous countries in the world for journalists. According to the Committee to Protect Journalists' Global Impunity Index, 85 journalists have been killed in the Philippines from 1992 to 2021, making the Philippines the seventh worst country in the world in terms of number of journalists murdered and where most of their killers go unpunished.

The killing has been considered an attack on press freedom by some observers, such as former Vice President Leni Robredo and lawmakers Risa Hontiveros, Robin Padilla, France Castro, and Neri Colmenares. The killing has also added to the chilling effect on media, according to media watchdogs and other observers.

Department of the Interior and Local Government Secretary Benhur Abalos offered  of his own money to anyone who could provide information that would aid the investigations into the incident.

Charging of Gerald Bantag

President Bongbong Marcos expressed concern over Gerald Bantag's implication to the case remarking how he established "his own fiefdom" in the prison while he was Bureau of Corrections chief and vowed that investigation on the case will continue. Bantag expressed doubt that Marcos is being provided truthful information regarding the case and urged Justice Secretary Jesus Crispin Remulla to step down accusing him of manufacturing the motive for implicating him.

Discography

EP Albums
Iwan Mo Na Siya (Ivory Records, 1992)

Notes

References

2022 in the Philippines
October 2022 events in the Philippines
2022 crimes in the Philippines
Assassinated Filipino journalists
Deaths by firearm in the Philippines
Lapid, Percy; Killing of
October 2022 crimes in Asia